Petropoulos (the full name of the company is Petros Petropoulos A.E.B.E.) is today a major importer and distributor of vehicles and heavy machinery, having been, at the same time, one of the historic Greek tractor, vehicle and engine manufacturers.

History

Early steps 
The Petropoulos family has been involved in metal constructions for generations. Konstantinos Petropoulos was a well known manufacturer of church bells and metal products in the late 19th century, based in Amfissa and, later, in Lamia. According to tradition, there was a supposed well-kept "secret" behind the sound quality of the Petropoulos bells – the bell being today the recognizable company logo.

The company in its present form was founded by Petros Petropoulos in Thessaloniki in 1922. Early activities included sales of commercial vehicles as well as rebuilding of engines and vehicle assembly. This early construction activity involved assembly of Ford (1920s) and  Willys-Overland (1930s) passenger cars, and Diamond T and International trucks (1930s). The Petropoulos factory was put under German control during the Axis occupation of Greece in World War II. The company resumed business after the war, and in 1948 it moved its headquarters to Athens, where it already had created a subsidiary.

Post-WWII Development 

Rebuilding of engines remained a major activity until 1953, when Petropoulos greatly expanded the popularity of the diesel engine in Greece, thanks to its cooperation with British F. Perkins Limited. In 1956 Petropoulos made a bold move, investing in farm tractor production. Model Π-35 introduced in 1956, as well as the more powerful Π-55 that followed shortly, were based on International Harvester designs (powered, though, by Perkins engines). Competitively priced and robust, these tractors became immediate success stories; however, in the early 1960s the company was engaged in a legal dispute over market (competition) rules with Malkotsis, another Greek tractor manufacturer claiming a share in the fast developing tractor market, resulting in production delays that almost bankrupted the company.The company eventually abandoned production of its own tractor series and focused on engine production and truck and tractor assembly (Petropoulos-assembled trucks and tractors were exported to Europe and the Middle East). In 1974 it engaged into its boldest project, development and production of a new "smart" 4X4 truck family (Unitrak/Polytrak/Militrak models). The trucks sold fairly well to farmers, but the Greek Army ordered only small numbers of the Militrak version. This, and a 1984 change of a law that had made "farm vehicles" economically attractive, lead to termination of production. Once more the company, after heavily investing in an industrial project, was found in a dire financial state.

Decline of the Industrial Division and New Ventures 
Petropoulos has developed a variety of other industrial products, including power generators and forklift trucks (most notably the successful Dynalift family of Diesel- and Electric-powered forklifts). It even made an effort in 1994 to resume truck production, introducing a Swiss (Bucher) – designed vehicle as the Militrak II Duro;  however again, the vehicle was not adopted by the Greek Army.  

Since the late 1990s Petropoulos has decisively shifted to imports, trading and services retaining only a limited industrial activity. The company maintains a small museum within its facilities, with exhibits including a restored Π-35 tractor and a fully restored polytrak.

References 
 L.S. Skartsis, "Encyclopedia of Greek vehicles and aircraft", Achaikes Ekdoseis/Typorama, Patras, Greece (1995) 
L.S. Skartsis, "Greek Vehicle & Machine Manufacturers 1800 to present: A Pictorial History", Marathon (2012)  (eBook)
Company website 
Creta Post 
in.gr about agreement with Isuzu Motors
Metafores (Transportation) Press
Fleetnews about Petropoulos importing electric buses
 Agronews
Fortune Greece 
SEAM
BHCC 
Naftemporiki news about Petropoulos
Insurance Daily about the agreement of Petropoulos with the Bank of Piraeus
Bloomberg info about Petropoulos
Business News: Jaguar Land Rover part of Petropoulos first place in Europe
 To Vima: Petropoulos is number 2 in the 11 "Golden Companies of Greece" (From the Association of Greek Industrialists)
Ekathimerini  ND leader sets task for business Quote: "SEV (Association of Greek Industrialists) also cited the example of 11 special cases of business initiatives in the context of “Greece of the Worthy and Values.” They were Agroknow, Petros Petropoulos, Polyeco, the Zeus cooperative at Pieria, Epexyl, Workable, Athens Partnership, Junior Achievement Greece, Dr Anargyros Mariolis who is the recipient of the WONCA Europe Award of Excellence in Health Care for 2019, Mathesis, and Kivotos tou Kosmou (World’s Ark)."

External links 
Company website
Petropoulos in Dutch Auto Catalog
 

Agricultural machinery manufacturers of Greece
Tractor manufacturers of Greece
Truck manufacturers of Greece
Greek companies established in 1922
Vehicle manufacturing companies established in 1922
Manufacturing companies based in Athens
Greek brands